Herbert Söllner (24 August 1935 – 2 October 1990) was a German speed skater. He competed in the men's 500 metres event at the 1960 Winter Olympics.

References

1935 births
1990 deaths
German male speed skaters
Olympic speed skaters of the United Team of Germany
Speed skaters at the 1960 Winter Olympics
Place of birth missing